Jagannath Gupta Institute of Medical Sciences and Hospital is a  medical college established in 2016 located in Budge Budge, West Bengal. The institute offers undergraduate seats for MBBS(150 seats) which are recognised by the Medical Council of India and is a recognised MBBS college of West Bengal which serves people of Budge Budge for Covid-19 relief. The college provides various Medical courses. This college has a multi-service hospital.

See also

Organization and Administration

References

Medical colleges in West Bengal
Affiliates of West Bengal University of Health Sciences
2016 establishments in West Bengal